Toad Hop is an unincorporated census-designated place in Sugar Creek Township, Vigo County, in the U.S. state of Indiana. It is officially part of West Terre Haute. In 2010, Toad Hop was a census designated place. It is part of the Terre Haute metropolitan area.

Name origin
The origin of the name Toad Hop is deeply rooted in legend. One explanation is that the town was laid out on a swampy field, and the abundance of toads and frogs hopping around inspired the name.

Geography
This is the mostly wooded area between the I-70 exit (Darwin Road) and US 40.

Demographics

As of the 2010 Census, 108 people lived in Toad Hop. 107 residents were White and 1 was of two or more races. The median age was 40 years old.

References

Census-designated places in Indiana
Census-designated places in Vigo County, Indiana
Terre Haute metropolitan area